Crocus mathewii  is a species of flowering plant in the genus Crocus of the family Iridaceae. It is a cormous perennial native to southwestern Turkey.

References

mathewii
Flora of Turkey
Plants described in 1994